Rabbi Jacob Joseph of Polonne, (1710–1784) or Rabbi Yaakov Yosef of Pollonye, was one of the first and best known of the disciples of the founder of Hasidic Judaism, the Baal Shem Tov.

Biography
Yaakov Yosef (sometimes spelled Yacov Yoseph) had been a fervent adherent to the school of Lurianic Kabbalah. He was already an accomplished scholar when he attached himself to the Besht (Baal Shem Tov), and his becoming a disciple engendered much controversy, and indeed some persecution. At that time, he was the rabbi of the city of Shargorod for several years, and he was expelled from his position on a Friday afternoon in 1748. In several of his responsa, which he wrote in Rashkov, where he took up residence after his banishment from Sharogrod, he reveals the suffering which he had undergone. Later, he was appointed rabbi in Nemirov, a center of Hasidism, where he practiced daily fasting for five years, until the Besht came upon him.

His book, Toldos Yaacov Yosef, (published in 1780), was the first chassidic work ever published. In it repeats the phrase, "I have heard from my teacher", 249 times. He is one of the foremost sources for teachings from the Baal Shem Tov. Reb Yaacov Yosef was also somewhat known for his abrupt temperament, yet his teachings on the Zaddik, the saint-mystic and holy leader, provide an example of attainment of the highest degree of spiritual solitude, while also exemplifying the piety of a respected leader at the center of the community.

After the death of the Baal Shem Tov he thought that he should have succession and not the Maggid of Mezrich and Rabbi Pinchas of Kuritz.

Family
Rabbi Jacob Joseph's son was Rabbi Samson of Raszkow.

Teachings
Rabbi Jacob Joseph addresses the question regarding the dual requirement in Judaism to both love and fear God. Rabbi Jacob Joseph resolves this matter by asserting that when one reaches a high level of inwardness (of the soul), both fear and love of God coalesce into one, becoming indistinguishable from one another, eliminating the need to give priority to one over the other.

Works
Rabbi Jacob Josef authored four books:
 Toledot Yaakov Yosef (1780).  The first Chassidic work ever published, and the primary source for various sayings of the Ba‘al Shem Tov as well as members of his inner circle.  It is "in the main a compilation of sermons, arranged according to the Torah portion of the week.... [and] contains the most basic paradigms of the Hasidic worldview."
 Ben Porat Yosef (1781). Sermons, mainly on Genesis; also, the first book to contain “Igeret ‘aliyat ha-neshamah” (The Epistle of the Ascendance of the Soul).
 Tzafnat Paneach (1782), on Exodus
 Ketonet Pasim (1866; published posthumously),  on Leviticus and Numbers.

The titles of these four works are all biblical allusions to Rabbi Jacob Joseph's name, in particular the figure of Joseph.

References 

18th-century rabbis from the Russian Empire
Hasidic rabbis
1710 births
1784 deaths